Villa Nova, also known as The Captain Stephen M. Thomas House, is a historic home located near Laurinburg, Scotland County, North Carolina. It was built in 1880, and is a two-story, three bay by one bay, Italianate style brick dwelling, with one-story gabled roof ells. It has a free-standing one-story brick kitchen connected by a covered passage. It has a one-story front porch with a red and blue patterned grey slate roof.

It was added to the National Register of Historic Places in 1982.

References

Houses on the National Register of Historic Places in North Carolina
Italianate architecture in North Carolina
Houses completed in 1880
Houses in Scotland County, North Carolina
National Register of Historic Places in Scotland County, North Carolina